Chahe may refer to the following locations in China:

Chahe Township, in Eshan County, Yunnan
Chahe Subdistrict, Yangzhou, Jiangsu

Towns
 Chahe, Anhui, in Lai'an County, Anhui
 Chahe, Qixingguan District, Bijie, Guizhou
 Chahe, Weining County, Bijie, Guizhou
 Chahe, Hainan, in Changjiang County, Hainan
 Chahe, Hebei, in Tangshan, Hebei
 Chahe, Hubei, in Honghu, Hubei
 Chahe, Huai'an, in Huai'an, Jiangsu
 Chahe, Pizhou, in Pizhou, Jiangsu
 Chahe, Rudong County, in Rudong County, Jiangsu
 Chahe, Sichuan, in Xuanhan County, Sichuan

See also
 Chah (disambiguation)